The anterior grey column (also called the anterior cornu, anterior horn of spinal cord, motor horn or ventral horn) is the front column of grey matter in the spinal cord. It is one of the three grey columns. The anterior grey column contains motor neurons that affect the skeletal muscles while the posterior grey column receives information regarding touch and sensation. The anterior grey column is the column where the cell bodies of alpha motor neurons are located.

Structure

The anterior grey column, directed forward, is broad and of a rounded or quadrangular shape. Its posterior part is termed the base, and its anterior part the head, but these are not differentiated from each other by any well-defined constriction. It is separated from the surface of the medulla spinalis by a layer of white substance which is traversed by the bundles of the anterior nerve roots. In the thoracic region, the postero-lateral part of the anterior column projects laterally as a triangular field, which is named the lateral grey column.

Clinical significance
It is these cells that are affected in the following diseases, – amyotrophic lateral sclerosis, spinal and bulbar muscular atrophy, Charcot–Marie–Tooth disease, progressive muscular atrophy, all spinal muscular atrophies, poliomyelitis, and West Nile virus.

Pharmacological interaction
The anterior grey column is the target for some spasmolytic medications. Norepinephrine release here, (as induced by cyclobenzaprine) reduces spasms by innervation (reducing nerve activity) of alpha motor neurons via interaction with gamma fibers.

See also
 Alpha motor neuron
 Beta motor neuron
 Gamma motor neuron
 Posterior grey column

Additional images

References

Spinal cord